Marshalswick is an area of St Albans in Hertfordshire, England, located around 1.5 miles northeast of the city centre. The whole area historically fell within the bounds of Sandridge civil parish, but it is now divided with the northern part in Sandridge and the southern part in the unparished area of St Albans. Marshalswick borders on Jersey Farm, Fleetville and Bernards Heath. 
 
The 1950s Parish Church, St Mary's, was built as a daughter church of St Leonards Church Sandridge only becoming an ecclesiastical parish in its own right in 1972 when the continued expansion of St Albans bridged the two areas with the infilled housing.

History
The village of Marshalswick boasts a history dating back to the thirteenth Century and retains a unique Hertfordshire village feel. The name Marshalswick comes from John and William Marschal who owned the land between 1271 and 1377, and Wick which meant 'hamlet', 'town' or 'village' in Old English. The surrounding land, woods and gardens were the site of Marshals Wick Mansion, and the current residential road Marshals Drive is so named as the lane was originally the drive to the house.

Local facilities

Marshalswick is home to Sandringham School, which is situated on the Ridgeway. Residents of Marshalswick enjoy the use of local shops which are called 'The Quadrant'. These shops include two bakeries, a Budgens, a newsagent, Frost's Estate Agents, charity shops, hairdressers, wine merchants, fast food outlets and many other shops. The Quadrant also has a Sainsbury's Local petrol station, an M&S food hall and a library, which is open every day except Sunday and Wednesdays. The library includes a DVD collection, free computer use and a  children’s section.

"The Wick" is now a wooded park which includes a playground, large field and woodland walk area which are used frequently by local scout groups and dog walkers. Other notable places in Marshalswick, apart from the Wick, include St Mary's Church of England church, Homewood Road United Reformed Church and Marshalswick Baptist Free Church. The churches are each home to local Brownie (Girl Guides) units and their halls are used by many local groups.

Facts and figures
The average age for a person living in Marshalswick is 40 and 3.7% of residents are students.
The average 4 bedroom house costs £522,000 and house prices range from £350,000 to over £6,000,000  .

References

St Albans
City of St Albans